František Brůna (13 October 1944 in Dolní Kralovice – 24 April 2017) was a Czechoslovak handball player who competed in the 1972 Summer Olympics.

He was part of the Czechoslovak team which won the silver medal at the Munich Games. He played two matches and scored three goals.

Before that, he won the bronze medal at 1964 World Championship and gold medal at 1967 World Championship.

He died in April 2017 in Benešov at age of 72.

References

External links
 
 
 

1944 births
2017 deaths
Czech male handball players
Czechoslovak male handball players
Olympic handball players of Czechoslovakia
Handball players at the 1972 Summer Olympics
Olympic silver medalists for Czechoslovakia
Olympic medalists in handball
Medalists at the 1972 Summer Olympics
People from Benešov District
Sportspeople from the Central Bohemian Region